Étoile Lusitana Club is a Senegalese youth football academy based in Dakar.

History
Lusitania was founded on 20 April 2008 by Luís Norton de Matos, who holds 80% on the rights of the club, the other 20% holds a Senegalese company.

The team's academy made international headlines when it won the premier section of the Northern Ireland Milk Cup competition in 2010. The club's name is taken from the ancient name of the Roman Province in Portugal.

In the 2009 season, the team finished in sixth position in the Senegalese Second Division and te 2010 season on place six.

Current squad

Staff

Sports
Head coach
  Babacar Fall
	
Goalkeeper coach
  Serigne Mactar Dia

Fitness coach
  Souleymane Diallo
  Elder Fontes

Management
Business manager
  Samba Sow

Technical director
  Moussa Gueye

Financial director
  Mountakha Ndao

Reserve Squad

Notable players

 Idrissa Camará (Avellino)
 Casimiro (Sport Bissau e Benfica)
 Luciano Teixeira (Benfica)

 Hugo Eugenio Da Silva (Sporting Braga)

 Bakary Badji (FC Lorient)
 Pape Abdou Camara (Valenciennes)
 Pape Demba Camara (Sochaux)
 Alioune Badara Cissè (Espoir de Saint-Louis)
 Souleymane Diagne (Benfica)
 Mamadou Djamil Diatta (ASC Cambérène)

 Mame N'dongo Diaw (CIS Marigona)
 Charles Fall
 Pape Abdou Fall (Espoir Dakar)
 Mafall Leye (Thiès F.C.)
 Ibrahima Mbaye (Inter Milan)
 Moustapha Bara Ndione (ASC Niary Tally)
 Pape Demba Ndour
 Amadou Samba Wane (ASC Linguère)
 Alioune Badara Samb (Recreativo da Caála)

 Ameth Lô (A.C. Milan)

Achievements
 Milk Cup (Premier): 2010

Notable coaches
  Luis Norton De Matos (2008-2010)
  Oumar Diatta (2010-2011)

References

External links
 Official site

Football clubs in Senegal
2008 establishments in Senegal